The Kingdom of Poland (Latin: Regnum Poloniae) was a state in Central Europe.

Historical political entities
Kingdom of Poland, a kingdom existing from 1025 to 1031
Kingdom of Poland, a kingdom existing from 1076 to 1079
Kingdom of Poland, a kingdom in Greater Poland existing from 1295 to 1296, under the rule of Przemysł II
Kingdom of Poland, a confederal kingdom existing from 1300 to 1320
United Kingdom of Poland, a kingdom existing from 1320 to 1386
Kingdom of Poland, a kingdom existing from 1386 to 1569
Kingdom of Poland, a kingdom which from 1569 to 1795 was a member state of the Polish–Lithuanian Commonwealth

See also 
 List of Polish monarchs 
 General Confederation of the Kingdom of Poland 
 Congress Kingdom of Poland 
 Kingdom of Poland (November Uprising)
 Regency Kingdom of Poland

 
Political history of Poland